Jean-Guy Andre Trudel (born October 18, 1975) is a Canadian former professional ice hockey left winger. He played five games in the National Hockey League (NHL) with the Phoenix Coyotes and the Minnesota Wild. Trudel is currently the head coach of the Peoria Rivermen in the Southern Professional Hockey League (SPHL). He is also in charge of the Peoria Youth Hockey Association.

Playing career
As a youth, Trudel played in the 1989 Quebec International Pee-Wee Hockey Tournament with a minor ice hockey team from Amos, Quebec.

Trudel played junior ice hockey in the Quebec Major Junior Hockey League, his last two seasons for the Hull Olympiques, helping his team to a Memorial Cup berth in 1995.

Undrafted by any NHL team, Trudel had a lengthy career in the minor leagues, most notably for the Springfield Falcons of the American Hockey League, for which he is the all-time leading career scorer in goals and points, and during which time he was named an AHL Second Team All-Star in the 2000 season. He played his penultimate season in North America with the Houston Aeros of the AHL in 2003, finishing second in league scoring by a single point.

He then went to Europe to play in the Swiss National League A for the rest of his career, save for a single season with the Peoria Rivermen of the AHL in 2008, principally for HC Ambri-Piotta, for whom he finished in the top three in the league in either goals or points his four seasons with the team.

Coaching career
Trudel is currently a part owner and formerly the GM/Head Coach of the Peoria Mustangs in the NA3HL. He left his positions with the Mustangs to become head coach of the newest iteration of the Peoria Rivermen in the Southern Professional Hockey League. While with the Rivermen, he has won the SPHL's Coach of the Year three times.

Career statistics

Awards and honours

References

External links

1975 births
Living people
HC Ambrì-Piotta players
Beauport Harfangs players
Canadian ice hockey coaches
Canadian ice hockey left wingers
Chicago Wolves (IHL) players
Houston Aeros (1994–2013) players
Hull Olympiques players
Ice hockey people from Ontario
Sportspeople from Greater Sudbury
Kansas City Blades players
Minnesota Wild players
Peoria Rivermen (AHL) players
Peoria Rivermen (ECHL) players
Phoenix Coyotes players
Quad City Mallards (CoHL) players
San Antonio Dragons players
Springfield Falcons players
Undrafted National Hockey League players
Verdun Collège Français players
ZSC Lions players